The grey woodpecker has been split into the following species:

 African grey woodpecker, 	Dendropicos goertae
 Eastern grey woodpecker, 	Dendropicos spodocephalus

Birds by common name